The buying decision process is the decision-making process used by consumers regarding the market transactions before, during, and after the purchase of a good or service. It can be seen as a particular form of a cost–benefit analysis in the presence of multiple alternatives.

Common examples include shopping and deciding what to eat. Decision-making is a psychological construct. This means that although a decision cannot be "seen", we can infer from observable behavior that a decision has been made. Therefore, we conclude that a psychological "decision-making" event has occurred. It is a construction that imputes a commitment to action. That is, based on observable actions, we assume that people have made a commitment to effect the action.

Nobel laureate Herbert A. Simon sees economic decision-making as a vain attempt to be rational. Simon claimed (in 1947 and 1957) that if a complete analysis is to be done, a decision will be immensely complex. Simon also wrote that peoples' information processing ability is limited. The assumption of a perfectly rational economic actor is unrealistic. Consumers are influenced by emotional and nonrational considerations making attempts to be rational only partially successful. He called for replacing the perfect rationality assumptions of homo economicus with a conception of rationality tailored to cognitively limited agents. Even if the buyer decision process was highly rational, the required product information and/or knowledge is often substantially limited in quality or extent, as is the availability of potential alternatives. Factors such as cognitive effort and decision-making time also play a role.

Stages
The stages of the buyer decision process were first introduced by John Dewey in 1910. Later studies expanded upon Dewey's initial finding. Engel, Blackwell and Kollat in (1968).

Problem/Need Recognition - Recognize what the problem or need is and identify the product or type of product which is required. Page text.
Information Search - The consumer researches the product which would satisfy the recognized need.
Evaluation of Alternatives - The consumer evaluates the searched alternatives. Generally, the information search reveals multiple products for the consumer to evaluate and understand which product would be appropriate.
Purchase Decision - After the consumer has evaluated all the options and would be having the intention to buy any product, there could be now only two things which might just change the decision of the consumer of buying the product that is what the other peers of the consumer think of the product and any unforeseen circumstances. Unforeseen circumstances for example, in this case, could be financial losses which led to not buying of the product.
Post Purchase Behavior - After the purchase, the consumer may experience post-purchase dissonance feeling that buying another product would have been better. Addressing post-purchase dissonance spreads the good word for the product and increases the chance of frequent repurchase.

These five stages are a framework to evaluate customers' buying decision process. While many consumers pass through these stages in a fixed, linear sequence, some stages such as evaluation of alternatives may occur throughout the purchase decision. The time and effort devoted to each stage depend on a number of factors including the perceived risk and the consumer's motivations. In the case of an impulse purchase, such as the purchase of a chocolate bar as a personal treat, the consumer may spend minimal time engaged in information search and evaluation and proceed directly to the actual purchase.

Problem/need-recognition
Problem/Need-recognition is the first step in the buying decision. Without knowing what the customer needs, they will not be enticed to purchase the product. The need can be triggered by internal stimuli (e.g. hunger, thirst) or external stimuli (e.g. advertising).  Maslow held that needs are arranged in a hierarchy. According to Maslow's hierarchy, only when a person has fulfilled the needs at a certain stage, can he or she move to the next stage.
The problem must be the products or services available. It's how the problem must be recognized.

Information search
The information search stage is the next step that the customers may take after they have recognized the problem or need in order to find out what they feel is the best solution. This is the buyer's effort at searching the internal and external business environments to identify and observe sources of information related to the focal buying decision. The field of information has come a long way in the last forty years, and has enabled easier and faster information discovery. Consumers can rely on print, visual, and/or voice media for getting information.

Evaluation of alternatives

At this stage, consumers evaluate different products/brands on the basis of varying product attributes, and whether these can deliver the benefits that the customers are seeking.  This stage is heavily influenced by one's attitude, as "attitude puts one in a frame of mind: liking or disliking an object, moving towards or away from it".  Another factor that influences the evaluation process is the degree of involvement. For example, if the customer involvement is high, then he/she will evaluate a number of brands; whereas if it is low, only one brand will be evaluated.

Purchase decision
This is the fourth stage, where the purchase takes place. According to Kotler, Keller, Koshy, and Jha (2009), the final purchase decision can be disrupted by two factors: negative feedback from other customers and the level of motivation to comply or accept the feedback. For example, after going through the above three stages, a customer chooses to buy a Nikon D80 DSLR camera. However, because his good friend, who is also a photographer, gives him negative feedback, he will then be bound to change his preference. Secondly, the decision may be disrupted due to unanticipated situations such as a sudden job loss or the closing of a retail store.

Post-purchase behavior
These stages are important to keeping customers. Customers match products with their experiences on whether they are either content or discontent with the product. This affects the decision process for resemblant purchases from the same company in the future, mainly at the information search stage and evaluation of alternatives stage. If brand loyalty is made then customers will often fast-tracked or skip completely the information search and evaluation of alternative stages.

Either being content or discontent, a customer will spread good or bad opinions about the product. At this stage, companies try to make favorable post-purchase communication to encourage the customers to purchase. 

Also, cognitive dissonance (consumer confusion in marketing terms) is common at this stage; customers often go through the feelings of post-purchase psychological tension or anxiety. Questions include: "Have I made the right decision?", "Is it a good choice?", etc.

Models of buyer decision-making

There are generally three ways of analyzing consumer buying decisions:
 Economic models - largely quantitative and are based on the assumptions of rationality and near perfect knowledge. The consumer is seen to maximize its utility. See consumer theory. Game theory can also be used in some circumstances.
 Psychological models - psychological and cognitive processes such as motivation and need recognition. They are qualitative rather than quantitative and build on sociological factors like cultural influences and family influences.
 Consumer behavior models - practical models used by marketers. They typically blend both economic and psychological models.

In an early study of the buyer decision process literature, Frank Nicosia (Nicosia, F. 1966; pp 9–21) identified three types of buyer decision-making models. They are the univariate model (He called it the "simple scheme".) in which only one behavioral determinant was allowed in a stimulus-response type of relationship; the multi-variate model (He called it a "reduced form scheme".) in which numerous independent variables were assumed to determine buyer behavior; and finally the "system of equations" model (He called it a "structural scheme" or "process scheme".) in which numerous functional relations (either univariate or multivariate) interact in a complex system of equations. He concluded that only this third type of model is capable of expressing the complexity of buyer decision processes. In chapter 7, Nicosia builds a comprehensive model involving five modules. The encoding module includes determinants like "attributes of the brand", "environmental factors", "consumer's attributes", "attributes of the organization", and "attributes of the message". Other modules in the system include consumer decoding, search and evaluation, decision, and consumption.

Some neuromarketing research papers examined how to approach motivation as indexed by electroencephalographic (EEG) asymmetry over the prefrontal cortex predicts purchase decision when brand and price are varied. In a within-subjects design, the participants have presented purchase decision trials with 14 different grocery products (seven private labels and seven national brand products) whose prices were increased and decreased while their EEG activity was recorded. The results showed that relatively greater left frontal activation (i.e., higher approach motivation) during the decision period predicted an affirmative purchase decision. The relationship of frontal EEG asymmetry with purchase decision was stronger for national brand products compared with private label products and when the price of a product was below a normal price (i.e., implicit reference price) compared with when it was above a normal price. The higher perceived need for a product and higher perceived product quality were associated with greater relative left frontal activation.

For any high-involvement product category, the decision-making time is normally long and buyers generally evaluate the information available very cautiously. They also utilize an active information search process. The risk associated with such a decision is very high.

Neuroscience
Neuroscience is a useful tool and a source of theory development and testing in buyer decision-making research. Neuroimaging devices are used in Neuromarketing to investigate consumer behavior.

See also

References

Bibliography
 Carlyn, Marcia. "An Assessment of the Myers-Briggs Type Indicator." Journal of Personality Assessment. 41.5 (1977): 461–73.
Cheng, Many M., Peter F. Luckett, and Axel K. Schulz. "The Effects of Cognitive Style Diversity on Decision-Making Dyads: An Empirical Analysis in the Context of a Complex Task." Behavioral Research in Accounting. 15 (2003): 39–62.
Gardner, William L., and Mark J. Martinko. "Using the Myers-Briggs Type Indicator to Study Managers: A Literature Review and Research Agenda." Journal of Management. 22.1 (1996): 45–83.
Henderson, John C., and Paul C. Nutt. "Influence of Decision Style on Decision Making Behavior." Management Science. 26.4 (1980): 371–386.
Kennedy, Bryan R., and Ashely D. Kennedy. "Using the Myers-Briggs Type Indicator in Career Counseling." Journal of Employment Counseling. 41.1 (2004): 38–44.
 Bettman, James R. (1979). "An Information Processing Theory of Consumer Choice." Addison-Wesley Educational Publishers.
 Yang, Haiyang and Ziv Carmon (2010), "Consumer Decision Making," in Jagdish Sheth & Naresh Malhotra (eds.), Wiley International Encyclopedia of Marketing, New York: Wiley.
 Myers, I. (1962) Introduction to Type: A description of the theory and applications of the Myers-Briggs type indicator, Consulting Psychologists Press, Palo Alto Ca., 1962.
 Nicosia, F. (1966) Consumer Decision Processes, Prentice Hall, Englewood Cliffs, 1966.
Pittenger, David J. "The Utility of the Myers-Briggs Type Indicator." Review of Educational Research. 63:4 (1993): 467–488.
 Simon, H. (1947) Administrative behavior, Macmillan, New York, 1947, (also 2nd edition 1957).
Volkema, Roger J., and Ronald H. Gorman. "The Influence of Cognitive-Based Group Composition on Decision-Making Process and Outcome." Journal of Management Studies. 35.1 (1998): 105–121.

Decision theory
Consumer theory
Market (economics)